Verner Edmund Eklöf (8 March 1897 – 2 December 1955) was a Finnish sportsman active in the 1920s.

Career

Association football
Eklöf played association football at international level, scoring 17 goals in 32 appearances between 1919 and 1927. Eklöf played club football for HIFK and HJK. His move from HIFK to HJK in 1920 is considered the first major transfer in Finnish football history.

Olympics
Eklöf competed in the Nordic combined event at the 1924 Winter Olympics, finishing ninth overall.

References

External links
 

1897 births
1955 deaths
Finnish footballers
Finland international footballers
Helsingin Jalkapalloklubi players
Olympic Nordic combined skiers of Finland
Finnish male Nordic combined skiers
Nordic combined skiers at the 1924 Winter Olympics
HIFK Fotboll players
Association football forwards
Footballers from Helsinki
20th-century Finnish people